Ukraine competed at the 2003 Summer Universiade in Daegu, South Korea, from 21 to 31 August 2003. Ukrainian athletes did not compete in tennis and water polo. Ukraine's male football team finished 11th.

Medal summary

Medal by sports

Medalists

See also
 Ukraine at the 2003 Winter Universiade

References

Nations at the 2003 Summer Universiade
2003 in Ukrainian sport
2003